Disulfur dibromide is the inorganic compound with the formula S2Br2.  It is a yellow-brown liquid that fumes in air.  It is prepared by direct combination of the elements and purified by vacuum distillation.  The compound has no particular application, unlike the related sulfur compound disulfur dichloride.

The molecular structure is akin to that of disulfur dichloride (S2Cl2).  According to electron diffraction measurements, the BrSSBr dihedral angle is 84° and the Br-S-S angle is 107°.  The S-S distance is 1.980 Å, ca. 0.050 Å shorter than for S2Cl2.

References

Bromides
Disulfides
Sulfur halides